Pulchraplaga is a genus of mites in the family Leptolaelapidae. There is at least one described species in Pulchraplaga, P. caledonia.

References

Mesostigmata
Articles created by Qbugbot